Pioneer commonly refers to a settler who migrates to previously uninhabited or sparsely inhabited land.

In the United States pioneer commonly refers to an American pioneer, a person in American history who migrated west to join in settling and developing new areas.

Pioneer, The Pioneer, or pioneering may also refer to:

Companies and organizations
Pioneer Aerospace Corporation
Pioneer Chicken, an American fast-food restaurant chain
Pioneer Club Las Vegas, a casino in Las Vegas, Nevada, U.S.
Pioneer Corporation, a Japanese electronics manufacturer
Pioneer Energy, a Canadian gas station chain
Pioneer Entertainment, a Japanese anime company
Pioneer Hi-Bred, a U.S.-based agriculture company
Pioneer Hotel & Gambling Hall, Laughlin, Nevada, U.S.
Pioneer Instrument Company, an American aeronautical instrument manufacturer
Pioneer movement, a communist youth organization
Pioneer Natural Resources, an energy company in Texas, U.S.
Pioneer Pictures, a former American film studio
Pioneer Surgical Technology, a medical technology company in Michigan, U.S.
Pioneer Total Abstinence Association, Irish Catholics who avoid alcohol
Pioneers (missions agency), a Christian missions organization

Entertainment

Art
The Pioneer (Eugene, Oregon), a 1919 sculpture by Alexander Phimister Proctor
The Pioneer (painting), a 1904 painting by Frederick McCubbin
The Pioneer (Visalia, California), a sculpture in California by Solon H. Borglum
The Pioneers (sculpture), a 1928 sculpture in Illinois by Lorado Taft
Pioneer Monument (disambiguation) for others named "Pioneer Monument" or "Pioneer Memorial"

Film
Pioneer (film), a 2013 Norwegian film, directed by Erik Skjoldbjærg
The Pioneers (1903 film)
The Pioneers (1916 film), directed by Franklyn Barrett
The Pioneers (1926 film), directed by Raymond Longford
The Pioneers (1941 film), directed by Albert Herman
The Pioneers (2021 film), 2021 Chinese film

Games
Pioneer (pinball), a 1976 pinball machine produced by Gottlieb
Pioneer (video game), 2006 space trading and combat simulator

Music

Albums
Pioneer (The Band Perry album), 2013
Pioneer (The Maine album), 2011
Pioneer (Pioneer album), 2012
The Pioneers (album), by MC Eiht and Spice 1, 2004

Bands
Pioneer (band), an American Christian music band
The Pioneers (band), a Jamaican reggae vocal trio

Songs
"Pioneer" (song), by Freddie, 2015
"Pioneer", by The Band Perry, 2013, from Pioneer
"Pioneers", by For King & Country, 2018 from Burn the Ships

Literature
Pioneer (magazine), a Soviet/Russian monthly magazine
Pioneer (newspaper), various English-language newspapers
The Pioneer (South Australia), a newspaper
The Pioneer (India), an English-language newspaper published in India
The Pioneers (novel), by James Fenimore Cooper
The Pioneers: The Heroic Story of the Settlers Who Brought the American Ideal West, a 2019 book by David McCullough

Military
Pioneer (military), a soldier employed for engineering and construction tasks
Pioneer Column, an 1890 force of the British South Africa Company
AAI RQ-2 Pioneer, a U.S. military unmanned aerial vehicle
RSD-10 Pioneer, a Soviet missile
Scammell Pioneer Semi-trailer, a British tank recovery and transport vehicle
Scottish Aviation Pioneer, a British military aircraft

Places

Australia
Pioneer, Queensland
Pioneer, Tasmania
Pioneer River, in Queensland
Shire of Pioneer, a former local government area

United States
Pioneer, Arizona
Pioneer, California
Pioneer, Florida
Pioneer, Indiana
Pioneer, Iowa
Pioneer, Kansas
Pioneer, Louisiana
Pioneer, Michigan
Pioneer, Missouri
Pioneer, Nevada
Pioneer, Ohio
Pioneer, Tennessee

Other places
Pioneer, Alberta
Pioneer, Singapore

Rail transport 
Pioneer (locomotive), built in 1837
Pioneer (train), an Amtrak passenger train
Pioneer MRT station, a transit station in Singapore

Schools
Pioneer High School (Ann Arbor, Michigan), U.S.
Pioneer High School (San Jose, California), U.S.
Pioneer High School (Whittier, California), U.S.
Pioneer Junior College, Singapore
Pioneer-Pleasant Vale Schools, (Garfield County, Oklahoma) U.S.

Ships 
HMS Pioneer, several Royal Navy ships
USS Pioneer, several U.S. Navy ships
USC&GS Pioneer, several U.S. Coast and Geodetic Survey ships
Pioneer (paddle-steamer), an 1863 New Zealand gunboat
Pioneer (submarine), built for the American Civil War
Pioneer (schooner), an 1885 ship at the South Street Seaport Museum in New York City, U.S.
Pioneer (sidewheeler 1849), one of the first steamboats in California, U.S.

Sports

London Greenhouse Pioneers, an English basketball team
Pioneer Bowl, a football game
Pioneer Football League, a college conference
Pioneer League (baseball), a minor league
Pioneer Race Course, a former San Francisco horse racing course
Sacred Heart Pioneers, the athletic teams of the Sacred Heart University

Other
Pioneer program, a series of U.S. lunar, solar, and interplanetary unmanned space missions launched from 1958 through 1978
Pioneer species, a species that colonizes an otherwise barren environment
Pioneering (Scouting), creating structures with ropes and wood spars
Young Pioneers (disambiguation)

See also

Pioneer Award (disambiguation)
Pioneer Club (disambiguation)
Pioneer Days (disambiguation)
Pioneer League (disambiguation)
Pioneer Township (disambiguation)
Pionier (disambiguation)
Pioner (disambiguation)